Al-Kaffarah is a term in Islamic law meaning the expiation of sin, referred to special sanction to compensate for the offense or sin when the particular for violation (evil-doing) or unintentional murder is committed. Kaffarah is paid violating some action like fasting, oath, ihram and unintentional murder and semi-unintentional murder.

Etymology
The root of Al-Kaffarah is Kafar (Arabic: کَفَرَ), means covering. In Quran, Kaffarah as a kind of worship is the way that Allah ignore sins and covers them.
By Language Kaffarah means "a trait that tends to the expiation or atonement of sin". By Technique, it means a determined penalty that is done expiation for sin.

Types
Kaffarah is a special sanction to compensate for committing a sin, unintentional murder, or other offense. According to the Quran and Hadith, Kaffarah is classified into the following categories:

Unintentional murder and semi-unintentional murder

In Islamic law, a person who committed the unintentional murder must release a slave or a fast of two consecutive months and pay Diya unless murder's family forgive him. kaffara is the expiated treat for crimes while blood money (Diya), as the social function is paid to the relative of the dead, the definition describes the relationship between the offender and dead.

Fasting
Someone breaking a fast, or not following it from its inception, or having sexual intercourse with their spouse during it, without a reason accredited by Sharia is required to pay Kaffarah. The first payment method is to release a slave, and if that is not possible, a person should fast for two successive months, or feed sixty poor people.

Oaths
If someone breaks an oath, paying Kaffarah is necessary. In this case, Kaffarah could include:
Feeding ten poor people
Dress up to them (poor people)
Releasing a slave 
Fasting three days (if the person cannot afford any of the above)

Hajj
Anyone who violates Ihram restrictions in Hajj, (by having sexual intercourse, wearing a sewn dress, killing animals, etc.) must pay Kaffarah.
In this situation, Kaffarah respectively includes:
Three days of fasting
Feeding sixty people
Slaughtering a goat or even carrying out a badnah (carrying seven slaughters)
Sadaqah

Zihar
Zihar was a method of divorce used frequently by pagan Arabs. If someone does Zihar then returns to his wife, he must pay Kaffarah. In this situation, Kaffarah includes:
Fasting for two successive months
Feeding sixty poor people

See also
 Islamic economics
 Islamic socialism
 Islamic taxes
 Jizya
 Khums
 Kharaj
 Qard al-Hassan
 Sadaqah
 Zakat Council (Pakistan)

Notes

References

Zakat
Taxation in Islam
Arabic words and phrases
Islamic terminology
Islamic jurisprudence